William Alfred Buckingham (May 28, 1804 – February 5, 1875) was a Republican who served as the governor of Connecticut during the Civil War and later as a United States senator.

Biography
Born in Lebanon, Connecticut, the son of Samuel Buckingham (1770–1850) and Joanna (Matson) Buckingham (1777–1846), Buckingham attended the common schools and Bacon Academy in Colchester, Connecticut but never attended college. He was married on September 30, 1830, to Eliza Ripley, daughter of Dwight and Eliza (Coit) Ripley of Norwich. The couple had two children. William Ripley Buckingham was born October 27, 1836, and died in early childhood on December 12, 1838. Eliza Coit Buckingham was born December 7, 1838, and married William A. Aiken on August 28, 1862.

Career
Buckingham entered into a career in the mercantile industry, and in 1848 helped to organize the Hayward Rubber Company, a business that developed into a successful enterprise.

Buckingham served as the mayor of Norwich, Connecticut from 1849 to 1850, and again from 1856 to 1857.  He also served as Norwich's town treasurer and a member of the city council.
 
Winning the 1858 Republican gubernatorial nomination, Buckingham was elected in 1858 and served as the 41st Governor of Connecticut. He was reelected to the governorship each of the next seven years, in 1859, 1860, 1861, 1862, 1863, 1864 and 1865, serving from May 5, 1858, until  May 2, 1866. During his tenure, he dealt successfully with the effects of an economic panic that occurred in the state and with the outbreak of the Civil war. Buckingham arranged for troops, with 54 companies enlisting instead of 10. Before the General Assembly appropriated $2 million for military expenses, Buckingham had begun borrowing money in his own name to finance Connecticut's war efforts.

The outbreak of the Civil War was the major reason for Buckingham's long tenure as Connecticut's governor. A strong supporter of Abraham Lincoln, he hosted Lincoln when Lincoln campaigned in Connecticut, and a personal friendship formed between them.  When the President called on the Northern governors to assist him in prosecuting the war, Buckingham worked seven days a week, twelve hours a day. The state's major correspondent with the Federal government, he read and answered letters from troops in the field and visited troops at war as well as at home. Concerned for the welfare of Connecticut troops, he oversaw much of the procurement of men and materials for the war, and he is quoted as saying to an official in Washington: "Don't let any Connecticut man suffer for want of anything that can be done for him. If it costs money, draw on me for it." It is estimated that Connecticut sent 54,882 soldiers to fight in the Civil War.(3) In 1862, the United States Congress passed an act allowing for the enlistment of colored soldiers, and in November 1863, Buckingham persuaded the Connecticut General Assembly to authorize a state regiment of black soldiers, the first of which was to be the Twenty-Ninth. Buckingham is known as a "War Governor" for his work.

Buckingham declined renomination in 1866, and after leaving office, was elected to the U.S. Senate on March 4, 1869, and served until his death on February 5, 1875.  While in the Senate, Buckingham served as chairman of the U.S. Senate Committee on Engrossed Bills, the U.S. Senate Committee on Investigation and Retrenchment, and the U.S. Senate Committee on Indian Affairs.

Death and legacy
Buckingham died in Norwich on February 5, 1875. He is interred at Yantic Cemetery, Norwich, Connecticut.

The ship USS Governor Buckingham (1863) is named after him. Buckingham was a benefactor of Yale College and served as president of the Board of Trustees of Norwich Free Academy and as president of the Connecticut State Temperance Union. His house in Norwich is owned by the city and is listed on the National Register of Historical Places. A street and school are named in his honor in Norwich, and a statue of him is inside the State Capitol Building in Hartford.

Buckingham's house in Norwich is listed on the National Register of Historic Places.

See also
List of United States Congress members who died in office (1790–1899)

References

External links

 The Political Graveyard
 National Governors Association
 Govtrack US Congress
 
 Connecticut State Library
 American National Biography
 Dictionary of American Biography
 Buckingham, Samuel G. The Life of William A. Buckingham. Springfield: W.F. Adams Co., 1894
 U.S. Congress. Memorial Addresses. 43rd Cong., 2nd sess. from 1874 to 1875. Washington, D.C.: Government Printing Office, 1875.

1804 births
1875 deaths
People from Lebanon, Connecticut
American people of English descent
Republican Party United States senators from Connecticut
Republican Party governors of Connecticut
Union (American Civil War) state governors
Mayors of Norwich, Connecticut
Connecticut city council members
19th-century American politicians
People of Connecticut in the American Civil War
Bacon Academy alumni